is a Japanese actress. She made her film debut with Tora-san Goes Religious? in 1983.

Filmography

Film
 Tora-san Goes Religious? (1983)
 Final Take (1986)
 Chichi (1988)
 Kacho Shima Kosaku (1992)
 Unloved (2001)
 Casshern (2004)
 The Taste of Fish (2008)
 Rebirth (2011)
 Key of Life (2012)
 Orange (2015)
 Solomon's Perjury 2: Judgment (2015)
 Sun (2016)
 To Each His Own (2017)
 Shoplifters (2018)
 He Won't Kill, She Won't Die (2019)
 Come On, Kiss Me Again! (2020)
 Hiroshima Piano (2020)
 Love Mooning (2021)
 I'll Be Your Ears (2021)
 The Lone Ume Tree (2021)
 Whisper of the Heart (2022), Shizuku's mother
 Shylock's Children (2023)

Television
 Hissatsu Shigotonin V (1985)
 A.D. Boogie (1991)
 Imoto Yo (1994)
 Toki o Kakeru Shojo (1994)
 Hachidai Shogun Yoshimune (1995), Takehime
 Minikui Ahiru no Ko (1996)
 Sono Ki ni Naru Made (1996)
 Love Generation (1997)
 Perfect Love (1999)
 Yamato Nadeshiko (2000)
 Quiz (2000)
 Mona Lisa no Hohoemi (2000)
 Aoi (2000), Lady Okaji
 Handoku (2001)
 2001 no Otoko Un (2001)
 Hero (2001)
 Shomuni 3 (2002)
 Salaryman Kintaro 3 (2002)
 Marusa!! (2003)
 Diamond Girl (2003)
 Kimi ga Omoide ni Naru Mae ni (2004)
 Wonderful Life (2004)
 Hikari to Tomo ni (2004)
 Suna no Utsuwa (2004)
 Keishicho Kanshiki Han 2004 (2004)
 Risou no Seikatsu (2005)
 Sokoku (2005)
 Yonimo Kimyona Monogatari Nekama na Otoko (2005)
 Kegareta Shita (2005)
 Yoshitsune (2005)
 Boku no Aruku Michi (2006)
 59 Banme no Proposal (2006)
 Attention Please (2006)
 Jikou Keisatsu (2006)
 Hanochi (2007)
 Swan no Baka (2007)
 Hanazakari no Kimitachi e (2007)
 Natsu Kumo Agare (2007)
 Byouin no Chikara (2007)
 Warui Yatsura (2007)
 General Rouge no Gaisen (2010)
 Chichi, Nobunaga (2017)
 Aibou (2020–present) Mari Koide

References

External links
 
 
 
 Article on Jdorama

Japanese actresses
1966 births
Living people
People from Hino, Tokyo